George Whiteley, 1st Baron Marchamley PC (30 August 1855 – 21 October 1925) was a British Conservative turned Liberal Party politician. He served as Chief Whip between 1905 and 1908 in the Liberal administrations of Sir Henry Campbell-Bannerman and H. H. Asquith.

Background
Whiteley was the eldest son of George Whiteley, JP, of Woodlands, Blackburn, Lancashire.  His brother, Herbert, also became a Member of Parliament.

He was partner in a cotton-spinning firm and had major brewing interests.

Political career
As a Conservative, Whiteley was a Member of Parliament (MP) for Stockport from  1893 to 1900. He then joined the Liberal Party, in whose interest he was elected M.P. in 1900 for Pudsey, serving until 1908. He became Parliamentary Secretary to the Treasury (Chief Whip) when the Liberals came to power in December 1905, and was made a Privy Counsellor in 1907. On 1 June 1908, he resigned from Parliament by accepting appointment as Steward of the Manor of Northstead. It was thought that his retirement was due entirely to insomnia, from which he had suffered for a long period. On 3 July 1908 he was raised to the peerage as Baron Marchamley, of Hawkstone in the County of Shropshire. He contributed occasionally in the House of Lords, making his last speech in November 1919.  The Complete Peerage summarised up his oratory as: "A ready speaker, with a somewhat caustic humour, he was on the platform an effective asset to the Liberal Party".

He was made a JP for the counties of Hampshire in 1900, and Shropshire in 1908.

Family
Lord Marchamley married Alice, only child of William Tattersall, JP, of Quarry Bank, Blackburn, and St Anthony's Milnthorpe, in 1881. In 1907, he purchased, from the 4th Viscount Hill, Hawkstone Hall and its estates in Shropshire, later selling them in 1923.  His own title was taken from the village of Marchamley, near Hawkstone Hall, and after Hawkstone itself.

Lady Marchamley died in 1913. Marchamley survived her by twelve years and died at his home, 29 Princes Gardens, London, after an operation in October 1925, aged 70. He was buried in the churchyard of St Luke's, Weston-under-Redcastle, Shropshire.  He was succeeded in the barony by his son, William.

Arms

Gallery

References

External links 
 

Marchamley, George Whiteley, 1st Baron
Marchamley, George Whiteley, 1st Baron
Marchamley, George Whiteley, 1st Baron
Marchamley, George Whiteley, 1st Baron
Liberal Party (UK) MPs for English constituencies
UK MPs 1892–1895
UK MPs 1895–1900
UK MPs 1900–1906
UK MPs 1906–1910
UK MPs who were granted peerages
Conservative Party (UK) MPs for English constituencies
Members of the Parliament of the United Kingdom for Stockport
George
Peers created by Edward VII